Recontra Frente Norte 380 was a right-wing militant organization which occupied the Chilean embassy in Managua, Nicaragua, on 5 June 1995.  

The organization made no statements or demands, departed, and released their hostages unharmed following the incident.

Sources
 1995 Patterns of Global Terrorism U.S. Department of State, as reported by the Federation of American Scientists. April, 1996.

Foreign relations of Chile
Terrorism in Nicaragua
Paramilitary organizations based in Nicaragua
Terrorist incidents in Nicaragua
Terrorist incidents in North America in 1995